This is the discography for American jazz musician Hank Mobley.

As leader/co-leader

As sideman 

with Art Blakey's Jazz Messengers
 At the Cafe Bohemia, Vol. 1 (Blue Note, 1956) – recorded in 1955
 At the Cafe Bohemia, Vol. 2 (Blue Note, 1956) – recorded in 1955
 The Jazz Messengers (Columbia, 1956)
 Originally (Columbia, 1982) – recorded in 1956
 Just Coolin (Blue Note, 2020) – recorded in 1959
 At the Jazz Corner of the World (Blue Note, 1959)

with Kenny Burrell
 All Night Long (Prestige, 1957) – recorded in 1956
 K. B. Blues (Blue Note, 1979) – recorded in 1957

with Donald Byrd
 Byrd's Eye View (Transition, 1955)
 Byrd in Flight (Blue Note, 1960)
 A New Perspective (Blue Note, 1963)
 Mustang! (Blue Note, 1966)
 Blackjack (Blue Note, 1967)

with Sonny Clark
 Dial "S" for Sonny (Blue Note, 1957)
 My Conception (Blue Note, 1959)

with Miles Davis
 Someday My Prince Will Come (Columbia, 1961)
 The Complete Blackhawk (Columbia, 1961)
 Miles Davis at Carnegie Hall (Columbia, 1961)

with Kenny Dorham
 Afro-Cuban (Blue Note, 1955)
 Whistle Stop (Blue Note, 1961)

with Kenny Drew
 This Is New (Riverside, 1957)
 Undercurrent (Blue Note, 1961) – recorded in 1960

with Curtis Fuller
 The Opener (Blue Note, 1957)
 Sliding Easy (United Artists, 1959) 

with Dizzy Gillespie
 Afro (Norgran, 1954)
 Diz and Getz (Verve, 1955) – recorded in 1953
 Dizzy and Strings (Norgran, 1955) – recorded in 1954
 Jazz Recital (Norgran, 1956) – recorded in 1954-55

with Freddie Hubbard
 Goin' Up (Blue Note, 1961) – recorded in 1960
 Blue Spirits (Blue Note, 1967) – recorded in 1965-66

with Elvin Jones
Together! (Atlantic, 1961) with Philly Joe Jones
Midnight Walk (Atlantic, 1966)

with Lee Morgan
 Introducing Lee Morgan (Savoy, 1956)
 Lee Morgan Sextet (Blue Note, 1957) – recorded in 1956
 Cornbread (Blue Note, 1967) – recorded in 1965
 Charisma (Blue Note, 1969) – recorded in 1966
 The Rajah (Blue Note, 1985) – recorded in 1966

with Max Roach
 The Max Roach Quartet featuring Hank Mobley (Debut, 1954)
 The Max Roach 4 Plays Charlie Parker (EmArcy, 1957)
 MAX (Argo, 1958)

with Archie Shepp
Yasmina, a Black Woman (BYG Actuel, 1969)
Poem for Malcolm (BYG, 1969)

with Horace Silver
 Horace Silver and the Jazz Messengers (Blue Note, 1956) – recorded in 1954-55
 Silver's Blue (Epic, 1957) – recorded in 1956
 6 Pieces of Silver (Blue Note, 1957) – recorded in 1956
 The Stylings of Silver (Blue Note, 1957)

with Jimmy Smith
 A Date with Jimmy Smith Volume One (Blue Note, 1957)
 A Date with Jimmy Smith Volume Two (Blue Note, 1957) 

with others
 John Coltrane, Zoot Sims & Al Cohn, Tenor Conclave (Prestige, 1956)
 Art Farmer, Farmer's Market (New Jazz, 1956)
 Grant Green, I Want to Hold Your Hand (Blue Note, 1965)
 Johnny Griffin, A Blowin' Session (Blue Note, 1957)
 Herbie Hancock, My Point of View (Blue Note, 1963)
 Elmo Hope, Informal Jazz (Prestige 1956) (All-Star Sextets Milestone 1962)
 J. J. Johnson, The Eminent Jay Jay Johnson Volume 2 (Blue Note, 1955)
 Wynton Kelly, Interpretations (Vee-Jay, 1977)
 Jackie McLean, 4, 5 and 6 (Prestige, 1956)
 Tete Montoliu, I Wanna Talk About You (SteepleChase, 1980)
 Dizzy Reece,  Star Bright (Blue Note, 1959)
 Rita Reys, The Cool Voice of Rita Reys (Colombia, 1956)
 Freddie Roach, Good Move! (Blue Note, 1963)
 Doug Watkins, Watkins at Large (Transition, 1956) 
 Julius Watkins, Julius Watkins Sextet'' (Blue Note, 1955)

References

Discographies of American artists
Jazz discographies